Diadegma auricellae is a wasp first described by Horstmann in 2008. No subspecies are listed.

References

auricellae
Insects described in 2008